George Gobat (born at Charmoilles, in the Diocese of Basel, now Doubs, France, 1 July 1600; died 23 March 1679) was a French Jesuit theologian.

Life

He entered the Society of Jesus, 1 June 1618. After teaching the humanities he was professor of sacred sciences at Fribourg, Switzerland (1631–41), and of moral theology at the Jesuit college in Halle, Belgium (1641–44). He then was at Munich (1644–47), rector at Halle (1647–51), and professor of moral theology at Ratisbon (1651–54). He was rector at Fribourg (1654–56), and professor of moral theology at Constance (1656–60), where he was also penitentiary of the cathedral, a post he retained until his death.

Works

Besides his "Disputationes in Aristotelem" (Fribourg, 1633–34), and the Latin translation, "Narratio historica eorum quæ Societatis Jesu in Nova Francia fortiter egit et passa est anno 1648-49", from the French of Father Raguenau, S.J., there are mentioned smaller works on the Jubilee and on indulgences, and a collection of practical cases on the Sacraments entitled "Alphabetum". Later these cases were republished under the title "Experentiæ Theologicæ sive experimentalis theologia" (Munich, 1669 and Constance, 1670). The "Alphabetum quadraplex de voto, juramento, blasphemia, superstitione" appeared at Constance in 1672. These works were several times republished in three volumes under the heading "Opera Moralia", for instance, at Douai, 1701, the last edition being published at Venice, 1749.

Gobat follows the casuistic method, treating the different questions in a clear and simple style, and applying them especially to existing conditions in Germany, conditions well known to him from the confessional and the numerous cases referred to him for settlement. Several of his doctrines were later condemned by the Holy See, notably by Pope Innocent XI in 1679, the year of Gobat's death. The Douai edition (1701) of the "Opera Moralia" drew from Mgr. Gui de Sève de Rochechouart, Bishop of Arras, the censure of thirty-two propositions. The adversaries of the Jesuits in France, Germany, and Holland, eagerly seized the occasion for an attack on the "Jesuit moral", but several apologies were published to counter this; among these defenders of Gobat were Gabriel Daniel, S. J., who wrote "Apologie pour la doctrine des Jésuites" (Liege, 1703) and Johann Christoph Rassler, S.J., author of "Vindiciæ Gobatianæ" (Ingolstadt, 1706).

References

Attribution
 The entry cites:
Augustin de Backer and Carlos Sommervogel, Bibl. des éscrivains de la comp. de Jésus; 
Ignaz von Döllinger and Franz Heinrich Reusch, Gesch. der moralstreitigkeiten in der röm.-kath. Kirche (Nördlingen, 1890, I, 292 sqq.;
Hugo von Hurter, Nomenclator, s.v.; 
Kirchenlexicon, s.v.; 
Kirchliches handlexicon, s.v.

1600 births
1679 deaths
17th-century French Jesuits
17th-century French Catholic theologians